Songshan is a town of Luoyuan County in northeastern Fujian province, People's Republic of China, located adjacent to and southeast of the county seat. , it has six residential communities and 16 villages under its administration.

See also 
 List of township-level divisions of Fujian

References 

Towns in Fujian
Fuzhou